Dalmonte is a surname. Notable people with the surname include:

 Antonio Dalmonte (1919–2015), Italian footballer
 Luca Dalmonte (born 1963), Italian basketball coach